Yangxin railway station is a railway station in Yangxin County, China. It is an intermediate stop on the Dezhou–Dajiawa railway.

History
Construction started in November 2013. The station opened on 28 September 2015.

References 

Railway stations in Shandong
Railway stations in China opened in 2015